The 1966 season was the fifth season of national competitive association football in Australia and 83rd overall.

Cup competitions

Australia Cup

The competition began on 8 October 1966. Sixteen clubs had entered the competition with the final two clubs APIA Leichhardt and Sydney Hakoah qualifying for the Final. APIA Leichhardt won the Final match 2–0 with goals by Ricardo Campana and Bill Kerklaan.

Final

Retirements
 4 October 1966: Steve Feher, 28, former Canberra Deakin and ACT soccer captain.

References

External links
 Football Australia official website

1966 in Australian soccer
Seasons in Australian soccer